The Latin American Parliament (Parlatino) is a regional, permanent organization composed by the countries of Latin America and the Caribbean. It is a consultative assembly similar to the early European Parliament. Currently the institution is being considered to become the legislative organ of the Community of Latin American and Caribbean States.

Origins, mandate, principles and purpose
The Latin American Parliament (Parlatino) was created in 1964. Its current mandate is derived from the Treaty of Institutionalization which was ratified on 16 November 1987. Situated in Panama City, Panama, the Parlatino has 23 member parliaments, each of which sends to it 12 nominated plenipotentiaries. The plenipotentiaries must represent the views of their parent parliament, and take into consideration the principles of the Parliament which include the defence of democracy and the further intergeneration of Latin America. The purposes of the Parlatino are:
To promote, human rights, and economic and social development;
To maintain and foster relations with other "geographic parliaments" (such as the European Parliament, as well as international organisations);
To promote self-determination and defence against imperialism and colonialism.

Institutions

The main institutions of the Parlatino are:
The unicameral Plenary Assembly which meets annually;
The Board of Directors of the Plenary Assembly which is chaired by the President of the Assembly and oversees the work of the Parlatino between the Assembly's sessions.
In 2009 there were thirteen permanent committees:
Cattle-raising and fisheries;
Citizen safety, combat and prevention of narcotraffic, terrorism and organized crime;
Economic affairs, social debt and regional development;
Education, culture, science, technology and communication;
Energy and mines;
Environment and tourism;
Gender equity, childhood and youth;
Health;
Human rights, justice and prison policies;
Indigenous peoples and ethnic groups;
Labour, social security and legal affairs;
Political, municipal and integration affairs;
Utilities and defence of users and consumers.

Members

As of 2013, the following countries and territories are members of the Latin American Parliament:

See also
 Latin American Integration Association (LAIA)
 Union of South American Nations
 Latin American and Caribbean Congress in Solidarity with Puerto Rico’s Independence
 Latin America Memorial
 South American Parliament (proposed)
 Central American Parliament
 Andean Parliament
 Mercosur Parliament

Notes

References

External links
 official site in Portuguese and Spanish

Parliamentary assemblies
United Nations General Assembly observers
Supranational legislatures
1964 establishments in North America
1964 establishments in South America
Latin American Parliament